The 1877–78 Football Association Challenge Cup was the seventh staging of the FA Cup, England's oldest football tournament. Forty-three teams entered, four more than the previous season, although three of the forty-three never played a match.

First round

Replays

Second round

Third round

Replays

Fourth round

Replays

Semi finals

Final

References
 FA Cup Results Archive

1877-78
1877–78 in English football
FA Cup